Rimi Natsukawa Selection is the fourth compilation album released by Rimi Natsukawa on . It was only released outside Japan, in Taiwan, Singapore, South Korea, Malaysia and Hong Kong. It reached #1 on the Taiwanese album charts, charting for more than 60 weeks and selling over 42,000 copies.

Content

Tracks #1-#9 are recordings from 2001–2003, and are taken from Minamikaze, Tida: Tida Kaji nu Umui and Sora no Keshiki. "Kana yo Kana yo" is from 2004's Kaze no Michi, "Tokotowa no Uta" and "Kokoro Tsutae" are from 2005's Ayakaji no Ne. This is the first album appearance for Natsukawa's songs "Hagushichao" and "Sayōnara Arigatō (Ama no Kaze)," which were released as singles in December 2005 and August 2006, respectively. "Hagushichao" was placed on the album as a bonus track (the album is currently the only Natsukawa album featuring the song).

The Taiwanese version came with a DVD attached, featuring three music videos. One of them, "Tsuki nu Kaisha," was a song that did not feature in the CD.

Care was made to select Natsukawa tracks that had been covered by Chinese artists. Included are "Famureuta" (Jody Chiang's "Si Nian Yo (思念喲 I Miss You?)"), "Hana" (Wakin Chau's  "Hua Xin (花心 Flower Heart)"), "Nada Sōsō" (Huang Pin-Yuan's "Bai Lu Si (白鷺鷥 White Heron)"/Joi Chua's "Pei Wo Kan Ri Chu (陪我看日出 Watching the Sunrise with Me)"), "Shima Uta" (Fish Leong's "Bu Xiang Sui (不想睡 Not Sleepy)") and "Warabigami" (Cyndi Wang's "Fei Ba (飛吧 Flying Blind)").

Promotion

A month after the album's release, Natsukawa performed a Taiwanese concert to 3,000 people. A year later in December 2007, she performed two more due to the substantial sales of the album.

Track listings

CD

DVD

References

Rimi Natsukawa albums
2006 compilation albums
Music video compilation albums